Rondania is a genus of flies in the family Tachinidae.

Species
R. albipilosa Cantrell & Burwell, 2010
R. cinerea Cantrell & Burwell, 2010
R. cucullata Robineau-Desvoidy, 1850
R. dimidiata (Meigen, 1824)
R. dispar (Dufour, 1851)
R. fasciata (Macquart, 1834)
R. insularis (Bigot, 1891)
R. junatovi Richter, 1979
R. notata Robineau-Desvoidy, 1863
R. rubens Herting, 1969

References

Diptera of Europe
Dexiinae
Tachinidae genera
Taxa named by Jean-Baptiste Robineau-Desvoidy